DEFCON is a defense alert state (numbered 1–5) used by the United States Armed Forces. 

In the United Kingdom, DEFCON refers to numbered defence contract conditions issued by the Ministry of Defence.

Defcon, DEFCON, DEFCON 1, Defconn, etc., may also refer to:

People with the name
 Defconn (born 1977), South Korean rapper and comedian
 Defconn Girl (born 1990), a South Korean singer also known as Fat Cat

Arts, entertainment, and media

Games
 DEFCON (video game), a 2006 real-time strategy game
 Defcon 5 (1987 video game), an SDI Simulation game by Cosmi Corporation
 Defcon 5 (1995 video game), a science fiction first-person shooter video game developed by Millennium Interactive Ltd

Other uses in arts, entertainment, and media
 DEF CON Radio, a channel on SomaFM, which provides the music for the annual DEF CON hacker convention
 Defcon (album), a 1991 industrial album by :wumpscut:
 Def-Con 4, a 1985 post-apocalyptic film

Other uses
 DEF CON, a hacker convention held annually since 1993
 Campaign to Defend the Constitution or DefCon, an American organization for church and state separation
 MS-DEFCON, a Microsoft Patch Defense Condition Level By Woody Leonhard

See also
 Def (disambiguation)
 Defqon.1 Festival, an electronic music festival founded in 2003